Aridolis was a tyrant of Alabanda in Caria, who accompanied the Achaemenid king Xerxes I in his expedition against Greece, and was taken by the Greeks off Artemisium in 480 BCE, and sent to the isthmus of Corinth in chains. His successor may have been Amyntas II (son of Bubares).

References

6th-century BC births
People of the Greco-Persian Wars
5th-century BC rulers
Carian people
Rulers in the Achaemenid Empire
Military personnel of the Achaemenid Empire